Glen Paul Sulzberger (born 14 March 1973) played three One Day Internationals for New Zealand in 2000.

A middle-order batsman and off-spinner, he played first-class cricket for Central Districts from 1996 to 2005, captaining the team in 2001/02, 2003/04 and 2004/05. His highest score was 159 against Wellington in 1999/00, and his best bowling figures were 6 for 54 against Canterbury in 2003–04.

References

1973 births
Living people
New Zealand cricketers
New Zealand One Day International cricketers
Central Districts cricketers
People from Kaponga